Cristian Popescu Piedone (born 15 February 1963) is a Romanian convicted felon and politician who served as mayor of Bucharest's Sector 4 from 2008 until the 4 November 2015, when he resigned following the Colectiv nightclub fire and the subsequent 2015 Romanian protests.

Biography

Early life
Before the Romanian Revolution, Cristian Popescu was the head waiter at a seaside restaurant. In 1990, he opened his own restaurant named Restaurantul Ciocârlia ("Nightingale Restaurant") on the Dâmbovița River quay in Bucharest. Popescu joined the Party of Social Democracy in Romania (PDSR) in 1994 after the youth wing of the party started congregating in his restaurant.

He began studying at the Dimitre Gusti High School in Bucharest in 1991, at the age of 28, graduating four years later. He later continued his studies at the University of Petroșani, which he graduated in 2002.

Local councilor

In 2000, he was elected a member of the General Council of Bucharest on the lists of the Social Democratic Party (PSD), becoming also an inspector at the Sector 6 city hall. In 2004, he was elected councillor for Bucharest's Sector 6.

He subsequently quit the Social Democrats and joined the Christian Democratic National Peasants' Party (PNȚCD), then the National Democratic Bloc (BND), a small party created by trade unionists of Blocul Național Sindical ("National Union Bloc") and allied with Greater Romania Party (PRM) and finally joined the Conservative Party (PC).

Following the election of Bucharest Mayor Traian Băsescu as President of Romania, a by-election was held to replace the now-vacant function. Popescu was a candidate representing the National Democratic Bloc, gaining 37,985 votes, or 8,71%.

In 2007, obtained his driving license in Pitești, Argeș County after temporarily moving his domicile to Priboieni. Following a fraud and corruption investigation, the authorities decided to cancel his driving license, together with hundreds other licenses. Journalists noted that moving his domicile without resigning from his function as member of the local council is illegal. Additionally, while a resident in Priboieni, he registered a Cadillac in Bucharest, for which he was criminally prosecuted.

Popescu Piedone founded an NGO named Asociația pentru Protecția Cetățeanului ("Association for the Protection of the Citizen"), which drew criticism after receiving donations from the State Lottery, a state-owned company managed by a fellow Conservative Party member.

His assumed moniker, Piedone (Italian for "bigfoot") is taken from the Spaghetti Western character by that name starred by Bud Spencer. In 2006, Popescu legally changed his name to include Piedone.

Mayor of Bucharest's sectors 4 and 5

The Conservative Party's candidate for mayor in the 2008 in Sector 4, Popescu Piedone won the elections against PDL's Radu Silaghi.

Before the 2012 Romanian local election, Popescu negotiated with the National Union for the Progress of Romania (UNPR) to be their candidate. He resigned in September 2011 from being the prime-vice-president of the Conservative Party and president of its Bucharest branch. In October 2012, he announced that he would run on the Conservative Party ticket, but the following month, he announced that he would run on the UNPR side. Romanian MP Elena Udrea announced that Popescu Piedone would be the coordinator of the UNPR–PDL campaign. A few months later, in March 2012, Piedone decided to run on a Social Liberal Union (USL) ticket.

Popescu Piedone was reelected in the June 2012 elections, gaining 80.36% of the votes in Sector 4.

His Conservative Party merged with the Liberal Reformist Party (PLR) to form the Alliance of Liberals and Democrats (ALDE) and in July 2015, Popescu Piedone resigned ALDE, joining UNPR, as he claimed he has "a beautiful friendship" with its leader, Gabriel Oprea. In September 2015, he announced that he would run again for Sector 4 mayorship from the National Union for the Progress of Romania (UNPR).

A criminal complaint by the Save Bucharest Association related to the demolition of a building belonging to a heritage protected area was admitted by the Sector 4 court, with Piedone being officially criminally charged in August 2015. The case involves a building belonging to the Samurcășești Monastery which was demolished in order to be replaced a 5-floors building in association with a real estate investor.

On 30 October 2015, the Colectiv nightclub fire killed dozens of people. Since the nightclub had been authorized by mayor Piedone, protesters demanded his resignation, which he did on 4 November.

The National Anticorruption Directorate began investigating the case and they arrested Popescu Piedone on November 6 on charges of abuse of power for not respecting the fire safety laws when authorizing the nightclub.

In April 2016, Popescu Piedone registered as a candidate for the Sector 4 mayorship in the 2016 local elections, but his candidacy was contested by an association of the victims in the Colectiv nightclub fire. The judges of Bucharest Tribunal decided to disallow him from becoming a candidate. Following the 2020 local elections, Popescu Piedone was elected mayor of Sector 5.

In May 2022, the Bucharest Court of Appeal sentenced Popescu Piedone to 4 years of jail time for abuse of office in regards to the Colectiv nightclub fire trial. This also ended his term as mayor of Sector 5; Piedone was barred from public offices for an additional 5 years after the jail time.

References 

1963 births
Living people
Councillors in Romania
Mayors of the sectors of Bucharest
Social Democratic Party (Romania) politicians
Conservative Party (Romania) politicians
National Union for the Progress of Romania politicians